Guardsman was the name of a supervillain/superhero appearing in American comic books published by Marvel Comics. The name was later applied to a squad of agents who wear suits of power armor while working security at the Vault. The character first appeared in Iron Man #43 (Nov 1971).

Fictional character biography

Kevin O'Brien

Kevin O'Brien was born in Chicago. He became an engineer and inventor working for the newly opened Lakani Island plant of Stark Industries who came to the attention of Tony Stark when he invented a stun-ray that managed to harmlessly disperse a crowd of violent protestors. Tony invited Kevin to transfer to the main plant on Long Island, and he accepted. Despite a careless streak that once caused the laboratory he was working in to explode, he became a close friend of Tony and was soon appointed head of Stark Industries' research department.

On several occasions, Kevin assisted Tony and the supposed bodyguard Iron Man, notably against the Spymaster and the assistants the Espionage Elite, saving Tony's life on more than one occasion. Tony then decided to reveal to Kevin his secret identity of Iron Man, and to build for him a second suit of armor for use in the event of an emergency. That emergency would come a short time later, when Iron Man and girlfriend Marianne Rodgers were taken captive by the superhuman madman Mikas the Soulfather. Putting on the armor before being fully tested, Kevin fell prey to a malfunction in the cybernetic circuitry controlling the armor which apparently stimulated the regions of the brain where rage and jealousy originate.

Kevin found himself seized with sudden attraction for Marianne and became extremely jealous of Tony's power, looks, and fortune. At the same time, Simon Gilbert, then Chairman of the Board of Stark Industries' stockholders, grew alarmed that Tony was moving out of munitions production and mapped strategies with the board to seize controlling interest in the firm from Tony as principal stockholder. Clad in armor and calling himself the "Guardsman", Kevin offered to aid the board in their plot against Tony. As a show of support, he agreed to quell a protest rally outside the plant. The Guardsman aimed his repulsor rays at the crowd, injuring four protestors. Sickened by what he did, Kevin turned on the renegade board members, physically assaulting them. However, seeing Tony with Marianne caused him to once again become unbalanced, and he went outside to vent his rage on the growing crowd of protestors. Tony donned the Iron Man armor and engaged the Guardsman in battle to prevent him from doing more damage. Losing, the Guardsman sought refuge in an experimental tank. In an attempt to stop him without hurting him, Iron Man's repulsor rays were trained on the vehicle and accidentally hit its fuel supply. The tank exploded, killing Kevin.

Michael O'Brien

Michael O'Brien was also born in Chicago, Illinois. Some months after Kevin's death, when the details of the incident came to public light, Michael, a sergeant in the New York City Police Department, decided that the official investigation exonerating Iron Man's actions was a cover-up. Reopening the investigation without official sanction, Detective O'Brien confronted Tony Stark, interrogated several employees, and declared his intention of proving Stark responsible for his brother's death.

O'Brien finally hired Harry Key, an unscrupulous private investigator, to get him inside the Long Island plant. There O'Brien located the Guardsman armor and put it on, determined to use it to bring Iron Man to justice. However, the malfunction in the cybernetic circuitry that affected his brother's brain also affected Michael's brain, and he flew into a rage seeking to kill Iron Man. Iron Man confronted his attack and finally convinced him that the armor was causing him to act insanely. O'Brien collapsed on rebelling against his own urge to kill Iron Man. Stark took O'Brien into custody rather than press criminal charges, hoping to convince the man of his innocence in Kevin's death. While Stark worked on a new set of armor, the Japanese mutant Sunfire attacked the plant. Stark was unable to put on his new armor since it had not yet cooled, and unable to find any of his spare suits of armor since a saboteur had stolen them. Hence, he was forced to put on the Guardsman armor to fight off Sunfire. O'Brien witnessed Stark's heroic attempts to save lives over a video monitor, aware that Stark was risking a major heart attack by the strenuous activity. Escaping confinement, O'Brien decided he was wrong about Stark and determined to help him by donning the now-cooled Iron Man armor. Thus clad, he was mistaken for the real Iron Man and kidnapped by the Mandarin. Stark discovered an old set of Iron Man armor that the saboteur had overlooked and went to China to rescue O'Brien. Upon rescuing him, Stark chose to reveal his true identity to O'Brien before he went off to battle the Mandarin. O'Brien flew back to New York where he took custody of the Guardsman armor once more.

After Iron Man defeated the Mandarin, Stark fixed the malfunction in the Guardsman armor's circuitry so it was safe to wear. Michael O'Brien was determined to use the armor to vindicate both his brother's and his own senseless actions. When Stark International was taken over by the criminal Midas, the Guardsman joined with a number of Stark's other friends and allies to battle Midas' men. He was turned to gold by Midas' power, but was later restored to flesh. Having quit the police force, O'Brien interviewed for the position of security director at Project: Pegasus, the government energy research facility, after its previous director Quasar quit. With a high recommendation by Stark, O'Brien got the job. Sometime later, while guarding the Project, O'Brien's Guardsman armor was damaged in a battle with the subhuman Lava Men. It was later repaired at the Project's expense. O'Brien, as the Guardsman, has been living and working full-time in the Project since his appointment and has performed his duties capably.

Later, he was the security chief at Avengers Island. He also participated in the Iron Legion against Ultimo, wearing a re-creation of the Silver Centurion armor.

Ozkar Waters
A new Guardsman, Ozkar Waters, appears during the King in Black tie-in miniseries Planet of the Symbiotes. He is a mercenary for Alchemax and father of Bren Waters (the new host of the Toxin symbiote).

Other known Guardsmen

Current members
 Harold "Harry" Bright - member of the Vault Retrieval Team
 James "Jim" Cunningham - tried not to panic during the mass breakout of the Vault
 Marc Danson
 Paul Danvers
 Charles "Charlie" DeMulder
 Terence "Terry" Doocey
 Frank Ensign (Guardsman Prime) - helped transport the Wizard to prison; later aided Iron Man (Tony Stark).
 William "Billy" Fredricks - first appeared guarding the wounded Portal in hospital and later seen at Goodman, Lieber, Kurtzberg & Book.
 Sam Hanson
 Patrick Herbert - worked at the Vault, was tricked by Mainframe (Ian Wajler)
 Michael "Mike" Ivy - aided Guardsman Prime in the transportation of the Wizard.
 Emilio Layton - member of the Vault Retrieval Team
 Conrad Mahlstedt
 Russ Mendoza
 Fred Miller
 Asher O'Brien
 Howard Samuels - mentally attacked by Mentallo, but survived the breakout
 Jaxson Schirra
 Gregory Smoot - was chosen to test U.S. Agent using the Iron Monger armor
 Tim Teller
 Jerry Tinsley
 Eliot Villagran - seen guarding the hospitalized Portal

Former members
 Marty Delarosa - while off-duty, he met and flirted with Calypso who convinced him to sneak her into the Vault; once in, she killed him.
 Larson Dzon - deceased
 Curtis Elkins (Sentry) - member of the Jury and former friend of Hugh Taylor
 Chris Fallon - deceased
 Walt Hanna - deceased
 Rick McLaurin  - deceased
 Ravello Medina - deceased
 Corbin Rubinstein - deceased
 Chuck Scott - deceased
 Danny Stephens - worked at the Vault and was the first Guardsman taken hostage and killed by Venom (Eddie Brock)
 Pascal Tyler - killed Cinder, framing Luke Cage and Rhino
 Ernie Vancata
 Scott Washington (Hybrid) - also known as Guardsman 6, became known as Hybrid when the Riot, Phage, Lasher and Agony symbiotes merged with him after he was paralyzed in a gang shoot out

Powers and abilities
Both Guardsmen wore powered armor designed by Stark Industries. The Guardsman armor contained a powered exoskeleton that gave the wearer superhuman strength, allowing the operator to lift 40 tons under optimal conditions for about 3 minutes. The Guardsman armor's high-carbon steel-alloy mesh and radiation shielding also offer protection from most ballistic and even energy weapons.

Each palm of the Guardsman armor's gauntlets contains a charged ion "repulsor ray" emitter, capable of 45 seconds continuous discharge at a range of  before irregularities in the plasma cone diffuse the beam.

Kevin O'Brien had earned a Ph.D. in Engineering and was a gifted inventor. He also used a "stun-ray" device as a weapon.

Michael O'Brien is a good hand-to-hand combatant and was coached by Captain America. As a policeman, he carried a police-issue handgun and, as Avengers Security Chief, he used stun guns and other advanced weaponry.

Both Kevin and Michael suffered from emotional instability that was exacerbated by the cybernetic circuitry in the original Guardsman battle-suit, causing both men to go insane. Michael O'Brien was able to wear the Guardsman armor safely after psychologically coming to terms with his trauma over his brother's death. The armor circuitry has since been modified by Tony Stark to prevent its causing such adverse effects.

The Guardsman armor was replicated by Stane International for use at the Vault, and retained similar abilities to the original version. When the original armors were destroyed by Iron Man during the Armor Wars, Stane International attempted to re-create the Guardsman armor without Stark's designs; however, they proved inferior to the Stark-based models. Stark Enterprises replaced the second-generation Stane models with an improved design from Tony Stark.  Although superior to the Stane models, the new Stark Enterprises suits were limited to operation within the vicinity of the Vault, as a security measure to prevent misuse of their Iron Man-derived technology.

In other media

Television
 The Guardsmen appear in the Iron Man episode "The Armor Wars, Part 2" as security for the Vault alongside Hawkeye until Iron Man breaks in to disable the Guardsmen's armor.
 Two separate depictions of Guardsman appear in Iron Man: Armored Adventures.
 Michael O'Brien (voiced by Brian Drummond) is Stark International's security chief under Obadiah Stane. While he does not initially wear a powered suit of armor for most of his appearances, he eventually pilots the Crimson Dynamo suit in the episode "Seeing Red" and the Iron Monger mech in "Enter: Iron Monger". In the latter episode, he refuses to kill Iron Man while the hero was aiding a civilian and is subsequently fired by Stane for showing mercy. 
 The Guardsman appear in the episode "Armor Wars" as criminals and former Maggia enforcers, consisting of Force, Shockwave, and later Firepower, who were hired by Stane to become Stark International's commercial mascots and masquerade as superheroes by causing disasters to stop. Upon learning their armors are based on stolen specs for Iron Man's own, Pepper Potts exposes the Guardsmen as criminals while Iron Man and War Machine defeat them, though Stane escapes suspicion by claiming not to have had any knowledge of the Guardsmen's pasts.
 The Guardsmen appear in Avengers Assemble, voiced by Roger Craig Smith (in "Civil War, Part 3: The Drums of War"), David Kaye (in "Prison Break"), and Fred Tatasciore (in "Vibranium Curtain" Pt. 2). This version of the group serve as security for the Raft.

Merchandise
 A "Vault Guardsman" figure was released in Toy Biz's Spider-Man line under the "Techno Wars" label.
 A figure of Guardsman was released in wave 30 of the Marvel Minimates line.
 A figure of Guardsman was released in wave 2 of Hasbro's Iron Man 2 film tie-in toyline.
 A figure of a Vault Guardsman was released in Hasbro's Marvel Legends toy line.

References

External links
 Guardsman (I) at MarvelDirectory.com
 Guardsman (II) at MarvelDirectory.com
 http://www.marvunapp.com/Appendix4/villagraneliotgm.htm
 http://www.marvunapp.com/Appendix4/fredricksbillygm.htm

Characters created by Don Heck
Characters created by Herb Trimpe
Characters created by Len Wein
Comics characters introduced in 1970
Comics characters introduced in 1976
Fictional characters from Illinois
Guardsman
Marvel Comics police officers
Marvel Comics superheroes
Marvel Comics supervillains